Darlingtonica papua is a species of beetle in the family Cicindelidae, the only species in the genus Darlingtonica.

References

Cicindelidae
Monotypic Adephaga genera